Małgorzata Babicka (born 6 September 1973) is a former Polish female professional basketball player.

External links
Profile at fibaeurope.com

20th-century births
Living people
People from Jelenia Góra
Polish women's basketball players
Small forwards
Power forwards (basketball)